Peng Shuai was the defending champion, but lost in the semifinals to Maria Sharapova.

Sharapova went on to win the title, defeating Aryna Sabalenka in the final, 7–5, 7–6(10–8). This was Sharapova's first title after serving a suspension for a doping offense, and was her final career title before retiring in 2020.

Seeds

Draw

Finals

Top half

Bottom half

Qualifying

Seeds

Qualifiers

Lucky loser

Draw

First qualifier

Second qualifier

Third qualifier

Fourth qualifier

Fifth qualifier

Sixth qualifier

References
Main Draw
Qualifying Draw

Tianjin Open - Singles
Tianjin Open